Sthenias poleti is a species of beetle in the family Cerambycidae. It was described by Eugène Le Moult in 1938. It is known from Gabon and the Democratic Republic of the Congo.

References

poleti
Beetles described in 1938